Largus succinctus, known generally as Largus bug, is a species of bordered plant bug in the family Largidae. Other common names include the bordered plant bug and red bug. It is found in North America.

References

External links

 

Largidae
Articles created by Qbugbot
Insects described in 1763
Taxa named by Carl Linnaeus